The 2006–07 Scottish Premier League season was the ninth season of the Scottish Premier League. It began on 29 July 2006.

The league champions, Celtic and runners-up, Rangers, qualified for the UEFA Champions League on the return of Walter Smith as manager following a brief and disastrous reign by Frenchman Paul Le Guen. The team finishing third, Aberdeen qualified for the UEFA Cup, as did the Scottish Cup finalists Dunfermline Athletic. However, being the bottom-placed team in the SPL, Dunfermline were also relegated to the First Division.

Teams

Promotion and relegation from 2005–06
Promoted from First Division to Premier League
St Mirren

Relegated from Premier League to First Division
Livingston

Stadia and locations

Personnel

Managerial changes

Events

On 22 April 2007 Celtic beat Kilmarnock 2–1 to win the title for the second season running thanks to goals from Jan Vennegoor of Hesselink and Shunsuke Nakamura who scored a free-kick in the dying second of the match to clinch the title for Celtic
On 12 May 2007 Dunfermline Athletic were relegated to the First Division after a 2–1 defeat at Inverness CT and St Mirren came back from 2–0 down to win 3–2 at Motherwell.
On 20 May 2007 Aberdeen beat Rangers 2–0 at home in their final game of the season to qualify for the UEFA Cup.
For the second consecutive season, the top scorer was Kris Boyd of Rangers, with 20 goals.

League table

Results

Matches 1–22
During matches 1–22 each team played every other team twice (home and away).

Matches 23–33
During matches 23–33 each team played every other team once (either at home or away).

Matches 34–38
During matches 34–38 each team played every other team in their half of the table once.

Top six

Bottom six

Goals

Top scorers

Hat-tricks

Attendances
Overall 3.7 million spectators attended an average per match of just over 8,090. The average and highest attendances for SPL clubs during the 2006/07 season are shown below:

Source: SPL official website

Monthly awards

See also
2006–07 Celtic F.C. season
2006–07 Dundee United F.C. season
2006–07 Hibernian F.C. season
2006–07 Kilmarnock F.C. season
2006–07 Rangers F.C. season

References

Scottish Premier League seasons
1
Scot